The Greenland women's national handball team is the national team of Greenland managed by the Greenland Handball Federation. It takes part in international handball competitions. 

The team participated in the 2001 World Women's Handball Championship in Italy.

History
After the Greenland Handball Federation was recognized by the International Handball Federation as independent member in 1998, they played there first game against the Icelandic national team on 27 December 1998.

Results

World Championship

Pan American Championship

Nor. Ca. Championship

Coaches

*1) He already started in 1999 with coaching but his first game was in 2000

References

External links

IHF profile

Handball
Women's national handball teams
National team